The Hong Kong version of 1 vs. 100, called 以一敵百 (lit. "to oppose 100 people by 1 person"), was produced by Asia Television and it is the first Chinese language version of the show. It was first broadcast as a 1-hour special on September 24, 2006 where the contestants were winners of at least HK$30,000 on Who Wants to Be a Millionaire?, then it was aired every weeknight between September 25, 2006 and December 15, 2006. It was hosted by lyricist Wyman Wong (黃偉文).

Gameplay
The format of the show is based on the original Dutch version, Eén tegen 100. At the beginning, The One (阿一) is randomly selected from a group of 101 players and the other 100 people will become The Hundred (阿百).

Before each question is shown, the category of the question is revealed first, and the One can choose between two difficulty levels, Normal (一般) and Difficult (困難). After the question and the three options are shown, The Hundred is given 6 seconds to lock in their answer, then The One is given the opportunity to answer the question. If The One is correct, all opponents that got the question wrong are eliminated. The prize gained in The One's bank is based on the following formula:

Where  means integer part.

There is a ×2 doubler for The One which doubles the prize gained on a question. After The One has gained some money, three "escapes", 25, 50 and 75, which allows The One not to answer the question, can also be used in order. The opponents who got that wrong are still eliminated, but The One earns nothing on that question. Instead, 25%, 50% and 75% of the amount in The One's bank is deducted respectively. The One is not allowed to bail out at any point of the game.

If The One has eliminated all of The Hundred, The One wins the amount in the bank. If The One is incorrect, he or she is out of the game and loses the prize in the bank. But unlike other versions, a consolation prize is awarded, which depends on the number of opponents eliminated without using escapes:

When The One has completed the game successfully, the next One is chosen from all of The Hundred. If The One failed, the next One is chosen from those who got the last question right. If there are no survivors, one of all 100 opponents plays next.

The biggest possible winnings for The One is HK$1,237,431 (about US$159,000), which can be reached when The One answers 100 questions correctly, eliminates only 1 opponent on each question without using any escapes and uses the doubler on the last question. However, the biggest winnings record of the show is HK$603,933 (about US$77,800) only, which is less than half of that amount.

List of winners
Throughout the series, 11 people had eliminated all mob members, 9 of them are listed as follows:

Scheduling and ratings
Episode viewing figures from CSM Media Research.

See also
 Deal or No Deal (Hong Kong), a game show produced by ATV's competitor TVB in the same year

References

External links
Official site (via Internet archive)

1 vs. 100
Asia Television original programming
Asia Television
Chinese game shows
2006 Hong Kong television series debuts
2006 Hong Kong television series endings